A by-election was held on 4 August 2018 for the Selangor State Legislative Assembly seat of Sungai Kandis. The seat became vacant after the death of the former assemblyman, Mat Shuhaimi Shafiei from lymphatic cancer on 2 July 2018. Mat Shuhaimi was a member of the Parti Keadilan Rakyat, a component party of the state ruling Pakatan Harapan coalition. He won his seat after defeating BN, PAS and PRM candidates with a majority of 12,480 votes. It is the first by-election since the historic May 2018 general election that saw the first-ever change of federal government since independence.

The by-election was won by PKR's Zawawi Mughni amidst a drop in turnout.

Background 
The Sungai Kandis constituency contained the polling districts of Seksyen 34 Shah Alam, Sungai Kandis, Teluk Menegun, LLN Connought Bridge, Kampung Pandan, Kampung Jawa, Kota Raja, Taman Seri Andalas 1, Taman Seri Andalas 2, Taman Klang Jaya 1, Sentosa Dato Yusof Shahbuddin, Bukit Jati, Taman Seri Andalas 3, Taman Desawan, Sentosa Dato Abdul Hamid 1, Sentosa Dato Dagang, Jalan Raya Timur, Taman Klang Jaya 2, Sentosa Dato Abdul Hamid 2, Taman Maznah, Taman Menara Maju. It encompassed the southern part of Shah Alam and part of Klang City around Jalan Kebun.

The electoral roll to be used for this by-election was from the first quarter of 2018, last updated on 2 July 2018. The electoral roll contained 51,230 registered voters comprising 51,217 ordinary voters and 13 overseas voters. There was no early voters in the by-election, while the overseas and domestic postal voting applications was opened from 8 to 21 July. The Tanjung Hall of the Shah Alam City Council was used as the nomination centre and the official vote tallying centre.

It was estimated that the by-election would cost RM1.4 million. The EC also made several improvements for this by-election, including setting up two polling lanes for voters aged 60 and above, and adding more polling lanes at polling centres that had many voters. A total of 21 new lanes were created to avoid overcrowding of the voting lanes, making it a total of 109 lanes compared to 88 during the 2018 Malaysian general election.

The polling hours was extended from 8 am to 5.30 pm instead of 5pm in the general election. Any non-governmental organisations meeting the conditions were also allowed to observe the election process from the nomination day until the election results were announced.

Last election result

Timeline

Nomination
The nomination day for the elections was on 21 July 2018. The nomination for the by-election begun at 9am at Tanjung Hall in Section 19. As initially expected, the by-election was a straight contest between the Pakatan Harapan and Barisan Nasional, with PAS bowing out to make way for BN. Three candidates were contesting the seat. PKR chose Zawawi Mughni as their candidate for the by-election. Barisan Nasional chose Lokman Noor Adam, an UMNO Supreme Council member as their candidate. Independent Murthy Krishnasamy was the third candidate for the by-election.

Candidates 
Qualified candidates

Withdrew
Ahmad Kamaruddin: Parti Rakyat Malaysia member.

Campaign

The Pakatan Harapan candidate used the PKR logo as part of their campaign instead of the Pakatan Harapan logo as this logo was more recognised by the electorate of this constituency.

Result 
Zawawi Mughni won the by-election with a majority of 5,842 votes. PAS supporters were split between PH and BN despite PAS leadership's explicit support for the BN candidate.

Results according to polling districts

References

Notes 

2018 elections in Malaysia
Elections in Selangor
2018